Underbarrow and Bradleyfield is a civil parish in the South Lakeland District of Cumbria, England. It contains 32 listed buildings that are recorded in the National Heritage List for England.  All the listed buildings are designated at Grade II, the lowest of the three grades, which is applied to "buildings of national importance and special interest".  The parish is in the Lake District National Park.  It contains the small village of Underbarrow, and is otherwise completely rural.  The listed buildings include a church and a bridge, and all the others are farmhouses, farm buildings, and houses with associated structures.


Buildings

References

Citations

Sources

Lists of listed buildings in Cumbria